Smyrna FC or Bournabat Football and Rugby Club was a defunct sports club of Smyrna (present-day İzmir), Ottoman Empire.

History

Smyrna FC or Bournabat Football and Rugby Club was a club which was founded by Englishmen in the Ottoman Empire in 1894.

The Matches

See also
List of Turkish Sports Clubs by Foundation Dates

References

Defunct football clubs in Turkey
Rugby clubs established in 1894
Association football clubs established in 1894
Sports teams in İzmir
1894 establishments in the Ottoman Empire